Burscough Junction pronounced (Burs/co Junction) is one of two railway stations serving the town of Burscough in Lancashire, England. The station was the scene of the Burscough Junction Station Crash in 1880.

Service 

There is no Sunday service.

History 
The station opened in April 1849, and enjoyed a regular service to numerous destinations, including Preston, Blackburn, Southport and Liverpool. 

A serious railway accident occurred near the station in 1880 (for full details see Burscough Junction rail accident). After the locomotive swapped ends of the train at Burscough Junction it should have swapped line on departure for Liverpool, but the points had not been set to swap tracks, and so it proceeded straight on and it met the express from Liverpool, head on, at some distance down the line.

From the autumn of 1968, stopping express services to Scotland and the Lake District were withdrawn. In October of the following year, through trains to  also ceased and the remaining Blackpool to Liverpool stopping service was cut back to Ormskirk, leaving only local services and a few non-stop expresses; the line was severed entirely at Ormskirk from 4 May 1970. Singling followed at the end of June 1970. Unlike the other stations at Croston and Rufford, Burscough Junction retained its station buildings for a few years. These were demolished at the end of 1973, and replaced with the current, extremely basic, arrangement.

Interchange 
The other station in Burscough is Burscough Bridge, and is only ten minutes away by foot.  The name "Junction" is an anachronism: similar to Dalston Junction in London, the station no longer serves such a purpose.

Facilities
Only one platform remains in use, with basic shelters and a long-line public address system.  There are ticket machines which require card, so passengers paying cash will need to pay on the train. The platform is fully DDA-compliant, with step free access from the main entrance on Station Lane.

Burscough Curves 
During the rail restructuring of the 1960s and 1970s, the "Burscough Curves", which formed a link between the Ormskirk-Preston and Southport-Wigan lines were removed, although the formation survives. The North Curve was taken out of use and severed in July 1969, being lifted in 1973: it was last used for a Saturdays only empty train from Blackpool to Southport. The South Curve was singled in 1970, but remained in use to serve the extensive sidings at the MOD depot located just to the north of Burscough Junction station. It saw its last train in 1982.

The passenger service from Ormskirk to Burscough Junction and on to Southport, which used the southern curve, was withdrawn in 1962 as can be seen from the British Rail London Midland Region Timetable of that year.

Pressure from local transport groups, West Lancashire Borough Council and former Southport MP John Pugh has not so far persuaded Network Rail to reinstate the curves. Various schemes have been proposed, including the full electrification of the line from Southport via Burscough to Ormskirk using the same third rail system as Merseyrail.  This proposal would allow users of the Ormskirk branch of Merseyrail's Northern Line to reach Southport without having to travel via Sandhills.

In June 2009, the Association of Train Operating Companies, in its Connecting Communities: Expanding Access to the Rail Network report, called for funding for the reopening of this line as part of a £500m scheme to open 33 stations on 14 lines closed in the Beeching Axe, including seven new parkway stations. The uses of the curves in a new service pattern has been identified by Network Rail, if electrified along with the through lines.

Additionally, Network Rail has identified electrification of Wigan to Southport, together with the Ormskirk to Preston Line and the Burscough Curves as a possible source of new services.

Battery trains as enabler to open the curves

The New Merseyrail Fleet A Platform For Future Innovations document, mentions regarding Ormskirk-Preston enhancements, that there is the potential to use battery powered Merseyrail units that may improve the business case for opening the curves. The document states there will be a review after the Merseyrail units have been tested for battery operation in 2020.

MP unification
In March 2020, the MPs for Southport, South Ribble, West Lancs and Preston (Damien Moore, Katherine Fletcher, Rosie Cooper and Sir Mark Hendrick) along with Lancashire County Council leader Geoff Driver united in a bid to pressure Network Rail and the Government to reinstate the curves.

In March 2021 the council made a formal application to the Department for Transport for funding to reopen the curves.

Through-trains 
There is now no physical connection between the electric Merseyrail line at Ormskirk, and the Ormskirk-Preston line; passengers travelling from Liverpool must change to a diesel train at Ormskirk to continue to Preston.

Notes

References 
 "New study into Curves rail link", Harry James, The Champion, 27 February 2008, p. 9

External links 

 Potential Rail Improvements in North Western England - Evidence presented to the Transport Select Committee, 2002–03

Railway stations in the Borough of West Lancashire
Former Lancashire and Yorkshire Railway stations
Northern franchise railway stations
Railway stations in Great Britain opened in 1849
Burscough